Dean Constantine Sturridge (born 26 July 1973) is an English former professional footballer who played as a striker. As of the 2013–14 Premier League season, he is a football match commentator for beIN Sports.

Playing career

Derby County
Sturridge began his career as a trainee at Derby County, and worked his way through the ranks to make his first team debut on 11 January 1992 in a 1–0 defeat at Southend United.

He gained more first team action over the next years, particularly at lowly Torquay United during a loan spell in the 1994–95 season, where he gained many admirers for his performances. He then returned to score 20 goals that fired Derby to the Premier League. His first year in the top flight was also successful, scoring 11 league goals, including one of the goals of the season against Arsenal, and the club's very first in the Premier League when they drew 3–3 at home to Leeds United in an opening day thriller at the Baseball Ground (from which they relocated to the new Pride Park Stadium 12 months later). Leeds had been 2–0 up when Sturridge found the net for the Rams in the 77th minute, before Paul Simpson pulled them level a minute later. Lee Bowyer sent Leeds back ahead in the 85th minute, before Sturridge scored again in the 87th minute to rescue the game for his team.

He played five seasons in the Premier League for the club, and is their record goalscorer in the Premier League era (32 Premier League goals). After nearly a decade with the Rams, he left for local rivals Leicester City in January 2001 for £375,000.

Leicester City
Sturridge's time at Leicester was far less successful than at Derby, as consistent injury problems and a change of manager saw his place under threat. He scored 7 goals during 25 appearances in total before being loaned to First Division Wolverhampton Wanderers in November 2001, just 10 months after his arrival at Filbert Street.

Wolverhampton Wanderers
His time at Wolves started brightly as he netted four times in his opening two games. This convinced the club to make the loan permanent after the initial month and he signed for £350,000 on Christmas Eve 2001.

His goalscoring form continued throughout the season, and he finished as the club's leading goalscorer with 21 goals in total, which took them to the play-offs. The following season saw him notch another 11 which again helped the team achieve a play-off finish, where they won promotion to the Premier League after a 3–0 final win over Sheffield United.

The striker didn't enjoy much of the team's top flight season as a combination of injuries and new arrivals sidelined him for all but 5 games, and he was loaned out to Sheffield United.

He was unable to put his injury problems behind him though and never regained a regular starting place for Wolves again. He moved on to Queens Park Rangers on a free transfer in March 2005.

Queens Park Rangers
At Queens Park Rangers his injury problems continued and he was only able to appear in 11 matches for the team, and never scored for them. In December 2005, it was announced that he would be leaving the club.

Kidderminster Harriers
On 26 June 2006, Sturridge joined Kidderminster Harriers on a one-year deal along with former Tamworth goalkeeper Scott Bevan, possibly becoming the biggest name player the club have ever signed.

Sturridge's time at Kidderminster didn't work out well, despite initially earning praise from his new manager Mark Yates over his positive attitude. He featured in six matches without finding the net, before suffering an Achilles tendon injury which ended his season prematurely.

He was not offered a new contract at the end of season.

International career
In 1998, René Simões attempted to call up Sturridge for international duty with the Jamaica national team for the 1998 World Cup but the offer was rejected.

Media
In 1998, Sturridge appeared in season one of the fictional football drama Dream Team on Sky One (as himself) as a Harchester United player and was valued as a £5 million player.

BBC Radio Derby
Sturridge was acting as match summariser for BBC Radio Derby, following the sudden departure of Ted McMinn after the first match of the 2007–08 season. In this role he co-commentates, alongside Ross Fletcher, on all games played by his old club, Derby County. However, on the last game of the season, he revealed that he would not be returning to this role for the 2008–09 season as he wanted to focus on his coaching work.

Personal life
His brother, Simon, was also a professional footballer, most notably playing for Birmingham City and Stoke City. He is the uncle of Daniel Sturridge, a striker who last played for Perth Glory and has played for the England national team

Honours
Individual
 PFA Team of the Year: 1995–96 First Division

References

External links

Living people
1973 births
English footballers
English people of Jamaican descent
Association football forwards
Derby County F.C. players
Torquay United F.C. players
Leicester City F.C. players
Wolverhampton Wanderers F.C. players
Sheffield United F.C. players
Queens Park Rangers F.C. players
Kidderminster Harriers F.C. players
Premier League players
Footballers from Birmingham, West Midlands
Dean
Black British sportsmen